Walden Asset Management (WAM) is a division of Boston Trust & Investment Management Company.  Founded in 1975, it has been described as a "leader in socially responsible investing" (SRI). Walden Asset management employs in-house research to make its investments and also invests in commingled funds. The firm operates as a subsidiary of Boston Trust & Investment Management Company.

History
WAM was founded in 1975, shortly after the start of the modern SRI movement that was spurred by the Vietnam War. Since then, it has become a major player in the SRI community. Notable actions of WAM include its participation in the 1982 creation of the nation's first mutual fund with South African anti-apartheid screens and its 1992 initiation of a proxy policy of voting against boards of directors without women and minorities which was later adopted by many other investment firms. In 1994, WAM was the only investment manager to testify before the President's Glass Ceiling Commission, encouraging the full corporate disclosure of diversity information. 

In 2004, WAM and its parent company, Boston Trust and Investment Management, became fully employee-owned.

Socially Responsible Investment Strategies
WAM primarily encourages corporate responsibility and responsiveness through its share holdings. WAM also utilizes other forms of shareholder activism such as screening portfolios for companies that don't meet SRI standards, communicating directly with companies about relevant issues, introducing and voting on shareholder resolutions, and engaging in community development investing. 

WAM is a leading sponsor of the "say on pay" concept, under which a company's stockholders would have an approval right over the remuneration of the company's executives.

References

External links
Walden Asset Management
Bloomberg Businessweek

Investment management companies of the United States
Ethical investment